The name Katia has been used for three tropical cyclones worldwide: 

Atlantic Ocean: 
The name replaced Katrina after that name was retired after 2005.
 Hurricane Katia (2011), powerful Category 4 hurricane that affected Europe as a post-tropical cyclone. 
 Hurricane Katia (2017), small Category 2 hurricane that struck Tecolutla, Mexico as a weak Category 1 storm.
South-West Indian Ocean: 
 Tropical Storm Katia (1970)

Atlantic hurricane set index articles
South-West Indian Ocean cyclone set index articles